Sabinas is a city in Sabinas Municipality of the same name located in the northeastern quadrant of the state of Coahuila in Mexico. As of the 2005 census the city had a population of 47,933, while the municipality of which the city serves as municipal seat had a population of 53,042. The municipality has an area of 2,345.2 km² (905.49 sq mi). Its only other significant communities are the towns of Cloete and Agujita.

As of 2015, the population of the city was 63,522, while the metropolitan area had a population of 177,430 inhabitants.

Climate
The climate of the region is semi-arid.

References

Coahuila Enciclopedia de los Municipios de México

External links
Presidencia Municipal de Sabinas Official website

Populated places in Coahuila